Trachelipus rucneri is a species of woodlouse in the genus Trachelipus belonging to the family Trachelipodidae that can be found in Croatia.

References

External links

Trachelipodidae
Endemic fauna of Croatia
Woodlice of Europe
Crustaceans described in 1967